Prasat Bayang is a ruined temple near Angkor Borei, in eastern Cambodia.  The temple is known for having the earliest known depictions of  Khmer numerals, dating back to AD 604.

References

Angkorian sites
Khmer language
Ruins in Cambodia